Temnostoma vespiforme is a species of hoverfly. Larva of this species feed in decaying wood of deciduous trees.

Distribution
Europe.

References

Diptera of Europe
Eristalinae
Flies described in 1758
Taxa named by Carl Linnaeus